also called Maizuru Castle is the remains of a castle structure in Kirishima, Kagoshima Prefecture, Japan. The site is called a Kokubu castle, but it is a fortified residence rather than a castle.

In 1604, Shimazu Yoshihiro built the castle and moved from Tomiguma Castle. Shimazu Yoshihisa lived a retired life in the castle, he died January 21 in 1611

Currently Kokubu elementary school is on site, but stone walls, moats and gates still remain.

References

Castles in Kagoshima Prefecture
Historic Sites of Japan
Former castles in Japan
Ruined castles in Japan
Shimazu clan
Kirishima, Kagoshima